Edward James Drewett (born 1 April 1988) is a British singer and songwriter who is best known for his contributions and collaborations with acts such as One Direction, Little Mix, Jonas Blue, The Wanted, Olly Murs, and SG Lewis.

Early life 
Drewett left school at age 16 and went to a performing arts college in Charlton, south-east London. He proceeded to attend vocal college BIMM in west London the following year.

Career

2009–present: Songwriting 
In 2009 he signed with leading worldwide publishers Warner/Chappell Music. Later that year he signed his first record deal with Virgin Records and was featured on Professor Green's hit single "I Need You Tonight", which charted at number three. In 2010 Drewett had his first number-one hit single as a writer. The song "All Time Low" for UK band The Wanted topped the UK charts in July that year. "Lightning" and the multi-platinum hit "Glad You Came" followed in 2011. "Glad You Came" was by far the biggest with over 4 million in worldwide sales. It was Drewett's second UK number 1 hit single. The song also hit massive success in the US achieving a Top 3 hit single on the Billboard Hot 100 a Number 1 on US iTunes Chart and number 1 on Billboard's Pop Songs chart based on Nielsen BDS-based radio airplay.

In 2012 Drewett co-wrote three songs which featured on Olly Murs' double platinum album Right Place Right Time. The tracks were "What a Buzz", "The One", and the 2013 UK Top 5 single for Olly, "Dear Darlin'".  Dear Darlin was voted by Capital FM listeners as their favourite Olly Murs song.

In 2013/14/15 Drewett lent his talents to writing for X-Factor winners One Direction. The first song was "Best Song Ever", the lead single from their 2013 album, Midnight Memories and the title song for their movie, This Is Us. He co-wrote two other hit singles for the British group, "Steal My Girl" and their most recent single, "History".

In 2014 Drewett appeared as a contestant on the 8th series of Britain's Got Talent, controversially billed by the show as an "unknown songwriter", despite his extensive previous successes and involvement with One Direction.

In 2015 Ed Drewett hit another chart high with the release of Little Mix's "Black Magic". The song topped the UK Charts for three consecutive weeks, gained a BRIT Nomination for Best Single, and achieved huge critical acclaim with Billboard naming the song #34 on their list of 100 Greatest Girl Group Songs of All Time. On 13 November 2015 the song was certified Platinum in the UK and It became the first song by a girl group to be certified Platinum in the United Kingdom since "Jai Ho! (You Are My Destiny)" by A. R. Rahman and The Pussycat Dolls featuring Nicole Scherzinger in 2009.

In 2016 he had songwriting collaborations with Craig David, Britney Spears, Mike and The Mechanics, and Louisa Johnson on her single "So Good".

Drewett's most recent chart endeavour was in 2017 when he co-wrote the Platinum selling single "Mama" by British DJ and record producer Jonas Blue, featuring Australian singer William Singe. As of October 2017 the single has over 308 million views on YouTube and has spent 22 weeks on the UK chart peaking at No.4.

In 2017 Ed Drewett was featured as a writer on Niall Horans Top 3 album Flicker with the track 'On My Own'.

2018 started strong for Drewett with two cuts on the Number 2 Craig David album The Time Is Now. Jonas Blue then released the massive "Rise" co-written by Drewett and ROMANS.

In 2020, Drewett co-wrote the UK's Eurovision Song Contest 2020 entry My Last Breath performed by the singer James Newman.

Discography

Singles as songwriter

As featured artist

Original Albums/EPs as Solo Artist

Original Songs as Solo Artist

References

External links
 Official website

1988 births
Living people
Musicians from Essex
English male singers
English songwriters
People from Essex
21st-century English singers
21st-century British male singers
British male songwriters